The Nordrach Clinic, or Nordrach Sanatorium, was a clinic for the treatment of advanced tuberculosis. It was established in the late 19th century by Dr. Otto Walther in Nordrach in the Black Forest region of southwestern Germany. Some of Dr. Walther's uncustomary treatments included "overfeeding" (patients were given three daily plentiful feedings of milk, cheese, meat, sweets, starches, and fruits), the complete abstinence from any drugs (save morphine for the critically ill), and plentiful rest.

The Nordrach Clinic was small, housing a maximum of fifty patients, and very expensive. News of the successes of Nordrach soon spread and helped give rise to the sanatorium business in nearby Switzerland, a country whose landscape was much more suited to the high altitude and fresh wind regimen stressed by Nordrach. The Nordrach experiment also gave rise to several "mini Nordrachs", most notably Nordrach-in-Mendip, Nordach-on-Dee and Nordrach-in-Wales. 

Nordrach thrived as a sanatorium for people with tuberculosis through the early 1930s. However, as a Jew, Otto Walther came under increased scrutiny by the National Socialist (Nazi) Party after it came to power in Germany in 1933 and the clinic was eventually forced to close.

References
 Dormandy, Thomas. The White Death: A History of Tuberculosis. New York: New York University Press, 1999.
 Gibson, J.A. The Nordrach Treatment. London: 1901. 
 De Guerville, A.B. La lutte contre le tuberculose. Paris: Alphonse Lemerre, 1904 (translated as The Crusade against Phthisis. London: Hugh Rees, 1904; de Guerville recounts the experiences of his own successful treatment at Nordach in 1900).

20th century in Baden-Württemberg
Tuberculosis sanatoria in Germany
Defunct organisations based in Germany